A referendum on abolishing the post of Prime Minister was held in Senegal on 3 March 1963. The result was 99.45% of voters in favour of the change, with a 94.3% turnout.

Results

References

1963 referendums
Referendums in Senegal
1963 in Senegal